El Salvador competed at the 2022 World Aquatics Championships in Budapest, Hungary from 17 June to 3 July.

Open water swimming

El Salvador qualified one female open water swimmer.

Swimming

El Salvador entered two swimmers.

Men

Women

References

World Aquatics Championships
2022
Nations at the 2022 World Aquatics Championships